Felisa is a given name and surname. Notable people with the name include: 

given name
Felisa Batacan, Filipino journalist and writer of crime and mystery fiction
Felisa Miceli (born 1952), Argentine economist
Felisa Núñez Cubero (1924-2017), Spanish physicist
Felisa Rincón de Gautier (1897–1994), Puerto Rican politician
Felisa Wolfe-Simon, American microbial geobiologist and biogeochemist

surname
Amedeo Felisa (born 1946), CEO of Ferrari and Aston Martin